DNA-binding protein RFXANK is a protein that in humans is encoded by the RFXANK gene.

Function 

Major histocompatibility (MHC) class II molecules are transmembrane proteins that have a central role in development and control of the immune system. The protein encoded by this gene, along with regulatory factor X-associated protein and regulatory factor-5, forms a complex that binds to the X box motif of certain MHC class II gene promoters and activates their transcription. Once bound to the promoter, this complex associates with the non-DNA-binding factor MHC class II transactivator, which controls the cell type specificity and inducibility of MHC class II gene expression. This protein contains ankyrin repeats involved in protein-protein interactions. Mutations in this gene have been linked to bare lymphocyte syndrome type II, complementation group B. Two transcript variants encoding different isoforms have been described for this gene, with only one isoform showing activation activity.

Interactions 

RFXANK has been shown to interact with RFXAP and CIITA.

References

Further reading 

 
 
 
 
 
 
 
 
 
 
 
 

Transcription factors